David Schuller (born September 6, 1980) is an Austrian ice hockey player who is currently an unrestricted free agent who most recently played for HC TWK Innsbruck of the Austrian Hockey League (EBEL). On June 13, 2015, he joined Innsbruck after spending the majority of his career with EC KAC, agreeing to a one-year deal.

Schuller competed in the 2013 IIHF World Championship as a member of the Austria men's national ice hockey team.

References

External links

1980 births
Living people
Austrian ice hockey forwards
People from Bruck an der Mur District
HC TWK Innsbruck players
EC KAC players
Vienna Capitals players
Sportspeople from Styria